The Cotentin Peninsula, also known as the Cherbourg Peninsula, is a peninsula in Normandy that forms part of the northwest coast of France.  It extends north-westward into the English Channel, towards Great Britain. To its west lie the Gulf of Saint-Malo and the Channel Islands, and to the southwest lies the peninsula of Brittany.

The peninsula lies wholly within the department of Manche, in the region of Normandy.

Geography
The Cotentin peninsula is part of the Armorican Massif (with the exception of the Plain lying in the Paris Basin) and lies between the estuary of the Vire river and Mont Saint-Michel Bay. It is divided into three areas: the headland of Cap de la Hague, the Cotentin Pass (the Plain), and the valley of the Saire River (Val de Saire). It forms the bulk of the department of Manche. Its southern part, known as "le Marais" (the Marshlands), crosses from east to west from just north west of Saint Lo and east of Lessay and marks a natural border with the rest of Manche.

The largest town on the peninsula is Cherbourg-en-Cotentin, a major cross-channel port on the north coast, with a population of approximately 120,000. The population of the peninsula is about 250,000.

The western coast of the peninsula, known as the Côte des Îles ("Islands Coast"), faces the Channel Islands. Ferry links serve Carteret and the islands of Jersey, Guernsey and Alderney from Dielette. Off the east coast of the peninsula lies the island of Tatihou and the Îles Saint-Marcouf.

The oldest stone in France is found in outcroppings on the coast of Cap de la Hague, at the tip of the peninsula.<ref>[http://www.etab.ac-caen.fr/discip/geologie/precamb/lahagueEcalgrain/ecalgrain.htm Bay of Écalgrain and Bay of Cul-Rond]  Website "Lithothèque de Normandie"</ref>

Cotentin was almost an island at one time. Only a small strip of land in the heath of Lessay connected the peninsula with the mainland. Thanks to the so-called portes à flot (fr), which close at flood and open at ebb and which were built in the west coast and in the Baie des Veys, on the east coast, the Cotentin has become a peninsula.

The Côte des Havres lies between the Cape of  Carteret and the Cape of Granville. To the northwest, there are two sand dune systems: one stretching between Siouville-Hague and Vauville, the other one stretching between Cap of Carteret and Baubigny.

History

Roman Armorica
The peninsula formed part of the Roman geographical area of Armorica. The town known today as Coutances, capital of the Unelli, a Gaulish tribe, acquired the name of Constantia in 298 during the reign of Roman emperor Constantius Chlorus. The base of the peninsula, called in Latin the pagus Constantinus, joined together with the pagus Coriovallensis centred upon Cherbourg to the north, subsequently became known as the Cotentin. Under the Carolingians it was administered by viscounts drawn successively from members of the Saint-Sauveur family, at their seat Saint-Sauveur on the Douve.

Medieval history
King Alan the Great of Brittany (d. 907) waged war successfully on the Norsemen. As a result of his conquests, the Cotentin Peninsula was included theoretically in the territory of the Kingdom of Brittany, after the Treaty of Compiègne (867) with the king of the Franks. The kings of Brittany suffered continuing Norse invasions and Norman raids, and Brittany lost the Cotentin Peninsula (and Avranchin nearby) after only 70 years of political domination.

Meanwhile, Vikings settled on the Cotentin in the ninth and tenth centuries. There are indications of a whaling industry there dating to the ninth century, possibly introduced by Norsemen. They were followed by Anglo-Norse and Anglo-Danish people, who established themselves as farmers. The Cotentin became part of Normandy in the early tenth century. Many placenames there are derived from the Norse language. Examples include La Hague, from hagi ("meadow" or "enclosure"), and La Hougue, from haugr ("hill" or "mound"). Other names are typical: all those ending with -tot (Quettetot..) from topt "site of a house" (modern -toft), -bec (Bricquebec, Houlbec..) from bekkr "brook", "stream", etc.

In 1088 Robert Curthose, Duke of Normandy, enfeoffed the Cotentin to his brother Henry, who later became king of England. Henry, as count of the Cotentin, established his first power base there and in the adjoining Avranchin, which lay to the south, beyond the River Thar.

During the Hundred Years War, King Edward III of England landed in the bay of La Hougue, and then went to the Church of Quettehou in Val de Saire. It was there that Edward III knighted his son Edward, the Black Prince. A remembrance plaque can be seen next to the altar.

Modern history

The naval Battle of La Hogue in 1692 was fought off Saint-Vaast-la-Hougue near Barfleur.

The town of Valognes was, until the French Revolution, a provincial social resort for the aristocracy, nicknamed the Versailles of Normandy. The social scene was described in the novels of Jules Barbey d'Aurevilly (himself from the Cotentin). Little now remains of the grand houses and châteaus; they were destroyed by combat there during the Battle of Normandy in World War II.

During World War II, part of the 1944 Battle of Normandy was fought in the Cotentin. The westernmost part of the D-Day landings was at Utah Beach, on the southeastern coast of the peninsula, and was followed by a campaign to occupy the peninsula and take Cherbourg.

The genetic history of the modern inhabitants of Cotentin Peninsula is being studied by the University of Leicester to determine the extent of Scandinavian ancestry in Normandy.

Economy
The peninsula's main economic resource is agriculture. Dairy and vegetable farming are prominent activities, as well as aquaculture of oysters and mussels along the coast. Cider and calvados are produced from locally grown apples and pears.

The region hosts two important nuclear power facilities. At Flamanville there is a nuclear power plant, and the La Hague nuclear reprocessing plant is located a few miles to the north, at Beaumont-Hague. The facility stores all high-level waste from the French nuclear power program in one large vault. Nuclear industry provides a substantial portion of jobs in the region. The roads used for transport of nuclear waste have been blocked many times in the past by environmental action group Greenpeace. Local environmental groups have voiced concerns about the radioactivity levels of the cooling water of both these nuclear sites, which is being flushed into the bay of Vauville; however, the emitted radioactivity is several orders of magnitude below natural background levels and does not pose any hazard.

There are two major naval shipyards in Cherbourg. The state-owned shipyard Naval Group has built French nuclear submarines since the 1960s. Privately owned CMN builds frigates and patrol vessels for various states, mostly from the Middle East.

Tourism is also an important economic activity in this region. Many tourists visit the D-Day invasion beaches, including Utah Beach in the Cotentin. At Sainte-Mère-Église a few miles away from the beach, there is a museum commemorating the action of the 82nd Airborne Division and 101st Airborne Division. The Cité de la Mer in Cherbourg is a museum of oceanic and underseas subjects. The main attraction is Redoutable, the first French nuclear submarine, launched in 1967.

Culture
After quitting political life, the political thinker Alexis de Tocqueville (1805-1859) retreated to the family estate of Tocqueville where he wrote much of his work.

Due to its comparative isolation, the peninsula is one of the remaining strongholds of the Norman language, and the local dialect is known as Cotentinais. The Norman language poet Côtis-Capel (1915-1986) described the environment of the peninsula, while French language poet Jacques Prévert made his home at Omonville-la-Petite. The painter Jean-François Millet (1814-1875) was also born on the peninsula.

The Norman language writer Alfred Rossel, native of Cherbourg, composed many songs which form part of the heritage of the region. Rossel's song Sus la mé ("on the sea") is often sung as a regional patriotic song.

References

Other sources

 Renaud, Jean: Les Vikings et la Normandie (Ouest-France. 2002) 
 Renaud, Jean: Les dieux des Vikings''  (Ouest-France. 2002) 

Cherbourg-en-Cotentin
Landforms of Manche
Landforms of Normandy
Peninsulas of Metropolitan France
Armorica